The Port of Rauma is a cargo port located in the city of Rauma, Finland on the shore of the southern part of Gulf of Bothnia.

In 2018, the port handled  5.8 million tons of international cargo, of which 72% was exports. The main export products were paper and cardboard, pulp and sawn timber, together accounting for approximately 80% of the total tonnage.

Specifications
The port comprises the following infrastructure:
"Petäjäs" quay: length , depth 
Container quay, old: length , depth 
Container quay, new: length , depth 
"Iso-Hakuni" quay: 5 side/rear loading berths, depth 
Oil terminal quay: depth 
Central harbour: length , depth 
"Laitsaari" and chemicals terminal quay: length  (combined), depth

See also
Kylmäpihlaja Lighthouse

References

External links

Rauma
Water transport in Finland
Buildings and structures in Rauma, Finland
Rauma, Finland